Donaldo Antonio Morales (born 13 October 1982) is a Honduran football goalkeeper, who plays for Motagua New Orleans of the Gulf Coast Premier League.

Club career
Donaldo made 100+ appearances for F.C. Motagua from 2005 to 2013. He won the 2012 Apertura goalkeeper award for conceding the fewest goals. A muscular injury forced Morales to start the 2013 Clausura season on the sidelines.

International career
He was also called for the Honduras national football team twice in 2006 and 2011.

Morales made his debut for Honduras in an August 2006 friendly match against Venezuela and has earned a total of 2 caps, scoring no goals. He was a non-playing squad member at the 2007 CONCACAF Gold Cup.

His final international was a September 2006 friendly match against El Salvador.

Honours and awards

Club
F.C. Motagua
Honduran Liga Nacional (2): 2006–07 A, 2010–11 C
Copa Interclubes UNCAF (1): 2007

References

External links

 Compa, usted va a volver a la selección (Profile and interview) - La Tribuna 

1982 births
Living people
People from Choluteca Department
Association football goalkeepers
Honduran footballers
Honduras international footballers
2007 CONCACAF Gold Cup players
F.C. Motagua players
C.D. Real Sociedad players
C.D. Social Sol players
C.D. Real de Minas players
Motagua New Orleans players
Liga Nacional de Fútbol Profesional de Honduras players
Gulf Coast Premier League players